Manush Patrika is a Bengali daily newspaper published from Agartala, the capital of the Indian state Tripura. It was established in 1952 by late Kamala Ranjan Talapatra who served as the editor for over 50 years. , his son, Priyabrata Talapatra is the editor. Its circulation is mainly limited to Tripura, and outside Agartala it is circulated in the cities of Bishalgar, Khowai, Udaipur, Dharmanagar, Kailasahar, Belonia and Teliamura.

History 
Manush Patrika began as a weekly and in 1974 it was transformed into a daily.  It is one of the oldest dailies of Tripura. Manush Patrika is the fourth largest circulated daily in Tripura with a circulation of about 14154 copies according to a survey conducted by NEDFI.

Content 

Manush Patrika has always criticised government policies that it views as not beneficial to the common people, and more than once they have faced the wrath of the government. On 5 January 1982 The Press Council of India upheld a complaint by Manush Patrika that the state government had illegally stopped advertisements to it. The council felt that there was a direct linkage between articles written by the daily and the stoppage of advertisements.

References

1952 establishments in India
Bengali-language newspapers published in India
Mass media in Tripura
Newspapers established in 1952
Newspapers published in Tripura